Henry Paul Monaghan (born 1934) is an American legal scholar. He was the Harlan Fiske Stone Professor of Constitutional Law at Columbia Law School from 1988 to 2019.

Biography 
Monaghan graduated from Holyoke Junior College in 1953, and received his Bachelor of Arts from the University of Massachusetts in 1955. He received his Bachelor of Laws from Yale Law School in 1958 and a Master of Laws from Harvard Law School in 1960.

Monaghan joined the Columbia Law School faculty in 1984. His scholarship has focused on constitutional law and federal courts. In 2018, he received the inaugural Daniel J. Meltzer Award from the Association of American Law Schools for his scholarship on the federal courts. His students included Columbia Law School professor Gillian E. Metzger and Dean of New York University School of Law Trevor Morrison.

He also argued a number of cases in state courts and three times before the Supreme Court of the United States. His views are considered conservative.

Monaghan was named a fellow of the American Academy of Arts and Sciences in 1988.

References 

Living people
Holyoke Community College alumni
University of Massachusetts alumni
Yale Law School alumni
Harvard Law School alumni
Columbia Law School faculty
American scholars of constitutional law
Fellows of the American Academy of Arts and Sciences
1934 births